James Lauritz Edlefsen (July 19, 1874 – May 11, 1948) served as mayor of Boise, Idaho, from 1936 to 1939.

Edlefsen was appointed mayor after his predecessor, Byron E. Hyatt, died in office in November 1936. He was elected to a full two-year term in 1937.

References

Sources
Mayors of Boise - Past and Present
Idaho State Historical Society Reference Series, Corrected List of Mayors, 1867-1996

Mayors of Boise, Idaho
1874 births
1948 deaths